Extraction 2 is an upcoming American action thriller film directed by Sam Hargrave and written by Joe Russo, based on the graphic novel Ciudad by Ande Parks, Joe Russo, Anthony Russo, Fernando León González, and Eric Skillman. A sequel to the 2020 film, Chris Hemsworth, Golshifteh Farahani and Adam Bessa reprise their roles, with Daniel Bernhardt and Tinatin Dalakishvili joining the cast.

Premise 
After being presumed dead in the first film, black ops mercenary Tyler Rake returns for another high-stakes mission.

Cast 
 Chris Hemsworth as Tyler Rake, a former SASR operator turned black ops mercenary.
 Golshifteh Farahani as Nik Khan, a mercenary and partner of Tyler.
 Adam Bessa as Yaz Kahn, a member of Nik's crew.
 Daniel Bernhardt
 Tinatin Dalakishvili

Production

Development 
In May 2020, it was reported Joe Russo had been hired to write a sequel to the film, with the intention of both Sam Hargrave and Chris Hemsworth returning. In December 2020, the Russo Brothers stated that beyond the sequel they hope to develop a series of films set within the world of Extraction to not only explore some of the characters that were introduced in the first film but to potentially launch a cinematic universe. In January 2021, it was rumored that the Russo brothers were also working on an origin story for Randeep Hooda's character Saju.

Filming 
Filming for the sequel was slated to begin in Sydney, Australia in September 2021, but measures related to the COVID-19 pandemic moved production to Prague. On November 29, 2021, Hargrave announced that principal photography had begun in Prague, Czech Republic, before Hemsworth announced that he began filming his scenes on December 4. Further shooting began in Vienna, Austria on January 28, 2022, and lasted until February 14, 2022. Scenes were shot at Donau City in the vicinity of the DC Towers. Filming officially wrapped on April 6, 2022. The film was shot on the ARRI ALEXA Mini LF cameras by implementing the same long-take strategies from the first film. 

Reshoots for the film took place in Prague in November 2022.

Release
Extraction 2 will be released by Netflix on June 16, 2023.

References

External links
 

Upcoming films
Upcoming Netflix original films
Upcoming sequel films
2020s English-language films
2020s chase films
American action thriller films
American chase films
American sequel films
Fictional mercenaries
Films based on American comics
Films directed by Sam Hargrave
Films shot in Prague
Films shot in Vienna
Live-action films based on comics
Oni Press adaptations